Gorst is an English, Welsh, and Jèrriais surname of Norman origin. It may refer to:

Charles Crawford Gorst (1885–1956), American educator and bird-imitator
Derek Gorst (1903–1981), British actor
Eldon Gorst, KCB (1861–1911), Consul-General in Egypt from 1907 to 1911
Ian Gorst (born 1969), the Chief Minister of Jersey
John Eldon Gorst PC, QC, FRS (1835–1916), British lawyer and politician
John Michael Gorst (1928–2010), British Conservative Party politician
Fedor Gorst (born 2000), Russian professional pool player

See also
Gorst, Washington, unincorporated community at the head of Sinclair Inlet in Kitsap County, Washington, United States
Chourst
Corston (disambiguation)
Garst (disambiguation)
Gorstan

vo:Gorst